"Puppy Love" is a popular song written by Paul Anka in 1960 for Annette Funicello, a Mouseketeer, whom he had a crush on. Anka's version reached No. 2 on the Billboard Hot 100 behind Percy Faith's "Theme from A Summer Place", No. 4 on the Canadian CHUM Charts, and No. 33 on the UK Singles Chart.

Donny Osmond version

Twelve years later the song was revived by Donny Osmond.  It was released on February 19, 1972, and reached No. 3 on the Billboard Hot 100 on April 1, 1972.  It peaked at No. 1 on both the Canadian RPM singles chart during April 15 - 29, 1972, and the UK Singles Chart during July 8 - August 5, 1972. Billboard ranked this version as the No. 67 song for 1972. It was certified Gold by the RIAA on March 24, 1972. It also topped the Mexican charts in 1972. The song was also covered by British pop group S Club Juniors in 2002.

On March 15, 1972, DJ Robert W. Morgan played the Donny Osmond version for 90 minutes straight on KHJ in Los Angeles. After receiving numerous calls from listeners, LAPD raided the station studios. The officers left without making arrests.

Charts

Weekly charts

Year-end charts

Certifications

See also
List of number-one hits of 1972 (Mexico)

References

1960 singles
1972 singles
2002 singles
Number-one singles in Australia
RPM Top Singles number-one singles
Number-one singles in New Zealand
UK Singles Chart number-one singles
Donny Osmond songs
Paul Anka songs
S Club 8 songs
Songs written by Paul Anka
Song recordings produced by Mike Curb
1960 songs
Number-one singles in Mexico